Monty Nash is an American drama series that aired in syndication from September 14 until December 14, 1971. It was based on a series of spy novels by Richard Telfair that were published from 1959 to 1961.

Synopsis
The series centered on Monty Nash, a government investigator who went undercover to catch criminals, including counterfeiters and smugglers.

Cast
Harry Guardino as Monty Nash

Episodes
</onlyinclude>

Music
"Theme from 'Monty Nash'" was written and produced by Michael Lloyd, and released as a single in 1971 on Quad Records (a division of
Four Star International, the studio that syndicated and co-produced the series), credited as by The Good Stuff, a group of session players.

References

External links

Monty Nash page at Spy Guys & Gals

1971 American television series debuts
1972 American television series endings
1970s American crime drama television series
First-run syndicated television programs in the United States
Television series by Four Star Television
Television series by 20th Century Fox Television
English-language television shows
Television shows based on American novels
Espionage television series